Browns Green (sometimes Brown's Green or historically Browne's Green) is a small area of Handsworth Wood, Birmingham, England.

Adjacent areas include Handsworth, Hamstead and the hilltop area of Sandwell Valley.

Areas of Birmingham, West Midlands